Spirembolus fasciatus is a species of sheet weavers found in the United States. It was described by Banks in 1904.

References

Linyphiidae
Spiders described in 1904
Spiders of the United States